In early Philippine history, the rank of lakan denoted a "paramount ruler" (or more specifically, "paramount datu") of one of the large coastal barangays (known as a "bayan") on the central and southern regions of the island of Luzon.

Overview

The lakan was democratically selected by other ruling datus from among themselves to serve as their "pangulo" (head). Writers such as William Henry Scott have suggested that this rank is equivalent to that of rajah, and that different ethnic groups either used one term or the other, or used the two words interchangeably. But other writers such as Nick Joaquin have suggested that the usage of the term "rajah" specifically indicates leadership of a bayan or barangay which has extensive trade relations with Muslim traders. Equivalent terms for this rank include the term "sultan" in the Muslim polities of Mindanao, and the term "datu" as used by various polities in the Visayas and in some areas of Mindanao.

Orthography 

There is no particular legal or academic prescription of orthography for the title of lakan. Thus it may be spelled separate from the person's name (e.g. "Lakan Dula"), or be incorporated with the name to form a single word (e.g. "Lakandula").

Rajah and lakan: It is sometimes argued that since the titles "rajah" and "lakan" are roughly equivalent, the two should not be used together. Thus, referring to Lakandula as Rajah Lakandula is said to be the result of mistaking Lakandula to be the full proper name of the said king.

Prominent lakans 
Users of the title lakan that figure in 16th- and 17th-century Spanish colonial accounts of Philippine history include:
Lakandula (later christened as Don Carlos Lacandola), ruler of Tondo when the Spanish conquest of Luzon began.
Lakan Tagkan, ruler of Namayan.
Lambusan (Lakan Busan), a king in pre-colonial Mandaue.
Lakan Usman, king of Bangsa Usman.

Present-day usage 
In present-day culture, the term is still occasionally used to mean "nobleman", but has mostly been adapted to other uses.

The name of Malacañan Palace, the official residence of the president of the Republic of the Philippines, is traditionally attributed to the phrase may lakan diyan, or "the king [or head] resides there".

In Filipino Martial Arts, lakan denotes an equivalent to the black belt rank. Also, beauty contests in the Philippines have taken to referring to the winner as "lakambini", the female equivalent of lakan. In such cases, the contestant's assigned escort can be referred to as a lakan. More often, a male pageant winner is named a lakan.

Philippine National Police Academy graduates are called lakan (male) and lakambini (female)

See also 

Principalía 
Maginoo
Datu
Maharlika
Timawa
Philippine shamans
Tondo (historical polity)
Barangay
History of the Philippines (pre-1521)

Sources 

Indigenous culture of the Tagalog people
History of the Philippines (900–1565)
Filipino paramount rulers
Filipino nobility
Filipino royalty
Social class in the Philippines